Mohammad Bagher Shafti (1761 in Charazeh – 22 March 1844 in Isfahan), also known as Rashti and Bidabadi, was an Iranian shia clergyman. The Seyyed mosque in Isfahan was built by him. According to Hossein Nasr and Hamid Dabashi, he is probably the first clergyman, who was titled as Hujjat al-Islam (proof of Islam). The reason for the titling was his double role as judge and Mufti and also his book about execution of Sharia.

References 

1761 births
1844 deaths
Iranian ayatollahs
18th-century Iranian people
19th-century Iranian people
People of Qajar Iran